Kåre Christiansen (April 10, 1911 – October 31, 1984) was a Norwegian bobsledder who competed in the early 1950s. At the 1952 Winter Olympics in Oslo, he finished 12th in the four-man and 13th in the two-man events.

References
1952 bobsleigh two-man results
1952 bobsleigh four-man results
Kåre Christiasen's profile at Sports Reference.com

Bobsledders at the 1952 Winter Olympics
Norwegian male bobsledders
1911 births
1984 deaths